McKenzie and Condon's Chicagoans was an American jazz band from Chicago, led by banjo player Eddie Condon and sponsored by singer and comb player Red McKenzie. Their four recordings in December 1927 were important influences on early Chicago style jazz.

The group got together in 1962 for a reunion, to record the album Chicago and All That Jazz. Pee Wee Russell replaced Frank Teschemacher, who had died in 1932, on the clarinet, and Bob Haggart filled in for the retired bassist Jim Lanigan. Trombonist Jack Teagarden joined the group for the sessions.

Recordings

Personnel
Eddie Condon – banjo
Bud Freeman – tenor saxophone
Gene Krupa – drums
Jim Lanigan – bass
Jimmy McPartland – cornet
Mezz Mezzrow – cymbals
Frank Teschemacher – clarinet
Joe Sullivan – piano

Notes

Musical groups established in 1927
Musical groups from Chicago
American jazz ensembles from Illinois
Dixieland ensembles
Jazz musicians from Illinois